The Savage Is Loose is a 1974 American drama film produced and directed by George C. Scott. It stars Scott, Trish Van Devere, John David Carson and Lee H. Montgomery.

Plot 
In 1902, John, his wife Maida and their infant son David are the only survivors of a ship that crashes into the rocky beach of an uncharted island during a violent storm. By 1912, David, now a seemingly happy 12-year-old boy, begins to enter puberty. By the time he is 17, David is consumed by lust for his mother, which drives a wedge between him and his father to the point where they hunt each other down for the affections of the only woman on the island.

Cast 

 George C. Scott as John
 Trish Van Devere as Maida
 John David Carson as David
 Lee H. Montgomery as Young David

Production 
The film was photographed entirely on location south of Puerto Vallarta, Mexico. It was produced by Campbell Devon Productions and distributed by George C. Scott through WCII on video (now out of print).

Rating controversy and distribution 
When the MPAA gave the film an "R" rating, Scott blasted the decision and urged exhibitors to defy it by running the movie unrated. Scott strongly disagreed with the MPAA's position that incest was a "major" theme of the film and said he was "appalled" that his movie was given the same rating as films like Candy Stripe Nurses and The Texas Chain Saw Massacre. Scott took out full-page newspaper ads in key cities offering a "money-back guarantee" from his own personal funds to any parent who took a child under 17 to the film and agreed with the R rating. Less than $10,000 was reportedly paid to patrons who accepted the offer.

The film was sold directly to regional exhibitors by sales executives, bypassing traditional distribution channels.

Reception 
Reviews from critics were largely negative. Vincent Canby of The New York Times wrote, "What begins as a kind of tab show version of 'The Swiss Family Robinson' quickly disintegrates into a muddled meditation upon the survival of the human race, but under conditions so special that the film's primal concerns eventually become ludicrous." Gene Siskel of the Chicago Tribune gave the film 1.5 stars out of 4 and called it "a pretentious potboiler" with characters that have "no identity other than sex-starved or sex-threatened." He ranked it behind only The Trial of Billy Jack on his year-end list of the worst films of 1974. Arthur D. Murphy of Variety wrote that "Scott and associates have done a first class job in making this film. All four performances are excellent, and Scott's direction (after the 'Rage' debacle) is in complete control." Pauline Kael of The New Yorker wrote that the film "crawls by in slightly under two hours, but they're about as agonizing as any two hours I've ever spent at the movies ... Scott has to take the rap for his crapehanger's direction and for not knowing better than to buy this script, but the scriptwriters, Max Ehrlich and Frank De Felitta, really ought to have their names inscribed in a special hall of infamy." Tom Milne of The Monthly Film Bulletin wrote, "The performances are sound enough, but it is difficult to feel much conviction when Trish Van Devere sports the same daintily besmirched white nightie throughout the eighteen odd years covered by the action, and when the jungle boy still moves and talks like a sullen Californian beach bum." Leonard Maltin's film guide gave its lowest rating of BOMB.

References

External links 
 
 

1974 drama films
American drama films
American independent films
American survival films
Films directed by George C. Scott
Films scored by Gil Mellé
Films set in 1902
Films set on islands
Films shot in Mexico
Incest in film
Rating controversies in film
1970s English-language films
1970s American films